Leptolebias splendens, also known as the Splendid pearlfish is a species of killifish in the family Rivulidae endemic to Brazil, in the vicinity of Rio de Janeiro. This species was described as Cynolebias splendens in 1942 by George S. Myers with the type locality given as water holes or ponds along the foot of the Serra de Petropolis in Rio de Janeiro State.  Deforestation and urbanisation led to the species disappearance from the area of its type locality and it was thought to be extinct but it was rediscovered  from the type locality some 70 years after the last known previous record.

References

splendens
Endemic fauna of Brazil
Fish of Brazil
Taxa named by George S. Myers 
Taxonomy articles created by Polbot
Fish described in 1942
Taxobox binomials not recognized by IUCN